Arctostaphylos pechoensis is a species of manzanita known by the common name Pecho manzanita. It is endemic to California, where it is known only from the Pecho Hills southwest of San Luis Obispo in San Luis Obispo County, California.

It is a plant of the chaparral and coastal coniferous forest.

Description
This is a large shrub, generally growing at least 2 meters tall and known to exceed five meters in height. Its smaller branches are woolly with long white bristles. The dense foliage of leaves are oval-shaped, smooth, toothed, or jagged along the edges, and overlapping. The inflorescence is a cluster of cone-shaped manzanita flowers, each about 7 millimeters long. The fruit is a hairless or nearly hairless red drupe about a centimeter wide.

References

External links
Jepson Manual Treatment
USDA Plants Profile
Photo gallery

pechoensis
Endemic flora of California
Natural history of the California chaparral and woodlands
Natural history of San Luis Obispo County, California
Plants described in 1914